Nothing Like Publicity is a 1936 British comedy film directed by Maclean Rogers and starring William Hartnell, Marjorie Taylor and Moira Lynd. It was made at Walton Studios as a quota quickie.

Cast
 William Hartnell as Pat Spencer 
 Marjorie Taylor as Denise Delorme  
 Moira Lynd as Miss Bradley  
 Ruby Miller as Sadie Sunshine  
 Max Adrian as Bob Wharncliffe  
 Isobel Scaife as Maid  
 Gordon McLeod as Sir Arthur Wharncliffe 
 Dorothy Hammond as Lady Wharncliffe  
 Aubrey Mallalieu as Mr. Dines  
 Rex Alderman as First reporter 
 Billy Bray as Billy Merrick  
 Neal Arden
 Michael Ripper

References

Bibliography
 Low, Rachael. Filmmaking in 1930s Britain. George Allen & Unwin, 1985.
 Wood, Linda. British Films, 1927-1939. British Film Institute, 1986.

External links

1936 films
British comedy films
1936 comedy films
Films shot at Nettlefold Studios
Films directed by Maclean Rogers
Quota quickies
British black-and-white films
1930s English-language films
1930s British films